Torpa may refer to:

 Torpa, Norway, a former municipality in Oppland county
 Torpa (district), Gothenburg, Sweden
 Torpa, Vänersborg, a district of Vänersborg, Sweden
 Torpa, Ydre, a village in Ydre Municipality, Sweden
 Torpa block, a community development block in Khunti district, Jharkhand, India
 Torpa (Vidhan Sabha constituency)
 Torpa, India, a census town in Jharkhand, India
 Torpa, a fictional town in Russia, in the 2007 novel Vita Nostra by Marina and Sergey Dyachenko]